Jesús Murillo Karam (born 2 March 1947) is a Mexican lawyer and politician affiliated with the Institutional Revolutionary Party (PRI). He served as governor of the state of Hidalgo from 1993 to 1998. In 1998 he became Undersecretary of Public Security and then joined the campaign of Francisco Labastida in the 2000 presidential election. He is of Lebanese descent.

In 2006 he was elected senator for his state and in February 2007 as secretary general of his party with Beatriz Paredes as president. He was president of the Commission of Interior in the Senate. In September 2012, he was elected to the LXII Legislature of Congress as the President of the Chamber of Deputies. He later resigned this position to become Attorney General.

He became Attorney General of Mexico (PGR) on 4 December 2012 and resigned on 27 February  2015 to head the Secretariat of Agrarian, Land, and Urban Development.

In August 2022 Murillo Karam was arrested over multiple charges (torture, forced disappearances, and offences against the administration of justice) related to the 2014 Iguala mass kidnapping during his tenure as attorney general.

* Requested a leave of absence to leave his post to serve as secretary general of his party.

References

1947 births
Living people
Governors of Hidalgo (state)
Institutional Revolutionary Party politicians
Members of the Chamber of Deputies (Mexico)
Presidents of the Chamber of Deputies (Mexico)
Members of the Senate of the Republic (Mexico)
Politicians from Hidalgo (state)
Mexican people of Lebanese descent
21st-century Mexican politicians
Attorneys general of Mexico